is the ninth single by Japanese band Princess Princess. Written by Kanako Nakayama and Kaori Okui, the single was released by CBS Sony on April 21, 1990. It became their third of five consecutive No. 1 singles on Oricon's singles chart.

Background 
"Oh Yeah!" was written as a cheering song for the band's national tour "Panic Tour '90: Parade Shō yo!", which started in April that year. The song's original key is A.

The song was used by Sony for their HF-X/UX cassette tape commercials. The B-side, "Papa", was used by KDD for their telephone commercials.

Chart performance 
"Oh Yeah!" hit No. 1 on Oricon's singles chart and No. 5 on Oricon's year-ending chart in 1990. It also sold over 575,000 copies and was certified Platinum by the RIAJ.

Track listing 
All lyrics are written by Kanako Nakayama; all music is composed by Kaori Okui and arranged by Princess Princess.

Chart positions 
Weekly chartsYear-end charts

Certifications

References

External links 
 
 

1990 singles
1990 songs
Princess Princess (band) songs
Japanese-language songs
Oricon Weekly number-one singles
Sony Music Entertainment Japan singles
Songs written by Kaori Kishitani